George Schussel (born 1941 in occupied France during World War II) is an American businessman and entrepreneur. In 1942, Schussel's father brought the family out of German-occupied territory into Spain, and subsequently into the United States. Educated at UCLA on the west coast and at Harvard on the east coast, Schussel became best known as the founder and chairman of Digital Consulting Institute (DCI). By 1998 DCI had become one of the most significant American conference and expo companies in the field of technology. Schussel's expertise on database, computing architectures, the internet and information management issues also inspired him to travel to many countries presenting lectures that gave his views on the latest computer technologies and probable directions for the future of computer technology. As of 2004, Schussel had given over 1,000 seminars for other technology professionals in countries such as France, UK, Belgium, Venezuela, Canada, Mexico, South Africa, Japan, and Australia.

Accomplishments
George Schussel has been the inventor and chairperson of computer industry trade shows such as Database World, Client/Server World, and Creating the Real Time Enterprise. His lectures have scored 9 on a 10-point scale and were noted for underlining and explaining technical issues, while focusing on the business benefits and uses of technology.

Schussel has authored the 1985 book Data Management: Past, present and future (Critical technology report), as well as co-authored the 1994 book Rightsizing Information Systems (Professional Reference). He has also authored or co-authored over 100 articles or columns in leading computer industry journals such as Computerworld, Datamation, Client Server Today and Data Based Advisor.

During his time at DCI, Schussel was credited as having consulted major clients such as Cullinet, Computer Associates, Revelation Technologies, Hewlett Packard, Sybase, AT&T/NCR, DEC, Sequent Computer Systems, Borland and IBM.

In 1998, Schussel was a recipient of the IEEE Computer Society's Computer Entrepreneur award for his important contributions to the computing industry and profession as an entrepreneurial leader, advisor, and member. Other recipients of the Computer Entrepreneur award that year were Bill Gates, Paul Allen, Steve Jobs, and Steve Wozniak. Schussel was also the recipient of the Outstanding Industrial Engineer of the Year award from the Institute of Industrial Engineers.

Additionally, Schussel was a fellow of the American Association for the Advancement of Science, and had CDP certification from the Data Processing Management Association.

Background/education
Schussel received his bachelor's degree from the University of California in physics and mathematics in 1961. Afterwards, he was accepted into Harvard University, and there received his master's degree in applied mathematics and computer science in 1962. In 1966 he received his doctorate from Harvard Business School in marketing and computer science. After graduation, he spent time lecturing and held a faculty appointment at the University of Southern California, Harvard, MIT, and the University of Alabama.

Prior to founding DCI in 1983, Schussel was Vice President and CIO at the American Mutual Group of insurance companies in Wakefield, Massachusetts. There he was the senior manager for the administration of a multimillion-dollar computer budget and 200 full-time personnel handling all data processing for the American Mutual Group.

DCI
George Schussel was the founder, as well as the chairman of Digital Consulting Institute (DCI), which was started in 1982 in his Lynnfield, Massachusetts, home.

As of 1998, DCI was the largest American-owned information systems conference and trade show company, holding small to large seminars across the world intended for professional audiences. As chairman, Schussel forecasted industry trends as well as identified new fields of opportunity for DCI trade shows. His input was crucial in the company's compounded growth rate of 30% per year through the 1990s. DCI's revenue was generated from ticket sales to participants who attended their seminars, trade shows, and other events, as well as from the contracting and selling of booth space to vendors participating in their shows. DCI also ran trade show events for other companies such as Sybase, IBM and Microsoft.

Tax dispute
In 2001, the IRS began an investigation of the tax accounting of DCI for the 1995 year, a period during which Schussel had been company CEO. By 2004, the IRS had decided that DCI had not been in compliance with US tax laws for its international business. DCI's position, as supported by tax counsel, was that its tax reporting on international income had been handled in accordance with US laws and in much the same manner as other companies such as Cisco Systems, Apple, IBM and AIG, which used foreign subsidiaries to hold assets. In 2004, George Schussel was charged by the United States District Court for the District of Massachusetts with conspiracy and tax evasion. By 2007, unable to agree on these tax issues, Schussel was individually tried for tax evasion. As of 2017, all issues, both civil and criminal, resulting from this case had been settled.

Charity
In March 2000, Schussel was recognized in the MIT Sloan School of Management alumni magazine for his philanthropic contributions towards MIT. In 1998 Schussel donated money to MIT Sloan for the endowment of a Professorship of Management Science chair. Currently this chair is held by Erik Brynjolfsson whose book ‘Race Against the Machine’ was CIO Insight's No. 1 pick for the top 10 IT-Business Books of 2011. Schussel has also served on the Dean's Leadership Council at the MIT Sloan School.

Although Schussel is not an alumnus of MIT, while a graduate student at Harvard, the classes he took at MIT gave him an early foundation in computer storage and retrieval techniques, which later proved valuable as he became expert in database technology. In addition, Schussel's family members held six degrees from the school, while one of his daughters met her husband there.

Beginning in 2016, the Schussels created the Schussel Family Fund which provides research funds to the Weinstock Laboratory of the Dana Farber Cancer Institute in Boston. A primary goal of the laboratory is to understand and develop clinical treatments for T-cell lymphomas. In 2017, George and Sandra became members of DFCI's Joint Visiting Committee on Basic Science. Additional funds have gone towards supporting research at the Smilow Cancer Hospital on T-cell lymphomas.

Prison Justice for America (PJA)
In 2013 Schussel founded the web site Prison Justice for America as a non-profit public service. The site launched with over 250 articles on the subject of criminal justice as practiced in the USA. Over the course of four years, PJA connected mentors with those seeking assistance on their reintegration into free society.  The United States incarcerates a higher percentage of its citizens than any other country in the world, and most individuals leaving the criminal justice system continue to suffer discrimination as they attempt to re-enter society. PJA's belief was that the whole approach of "tough on crime" had failed American society, and the goal was to support individuals to re-enter society as useful productive citizens. Over 100 individuals received personalized help and advice and in 2017 the site was shuttered.

References

1941 births
Living people
American businesspeople
Harvard Business School alumni
People from Lynnfield, Massachusetts